Luis Manuel Ramos Alatorre (born January 11, 1991, in Guadalajara, Jalisco) is a Mexican professional footballer who plays for Inter Playa del Carmen.

External links
 
 

Living people
1991 births
Mexican footballers
Association football defenders
Liga MX players
Ascenso MX players
Atlas F.C. footballers
Irapuato F.C. footballers
Footballers from Guadalajara, Jalisco